Telepathy  ( 感应 ) is a work for symphony orchestra,
composed by He Xuntian in 1987.

Summary
He Xuntian adopted RD Composition in his work Telepathy.

First performance
 Telepathy, He Xuntian Symphony Works Concert 1988.
 30 November 1988, Beijing Concert Hall, Beijing.
 China National Symphony Orchestra

References

Compositions by He Xuntian
Compositions for symphony orchestra
1987 compositions